Ilsan Line is a subway line operated by Korail, in Seoul, South Korea. Trains from this line continue to and from Seoul Metro's Line 3.

History 
The line started construction on March 15, 1991 as an extension of Seoul Metro Line 3 with the line opening in 1996. After the completion of the Ilsan Line, the Korean National Railroad suddenly announced that it would transfer ownership of the line to Seoul Metropolitan Government. According to the Korean National Railroad, the Seoul Metropolitan Government asked the Seoul Metropolitan Subway to take over the operation of the Ilsan Line, which is connected to the Seoul Subway Line 3, noting that redundant management facilities and workforce would be needed if Korean National Railroad operates the Ilsan Line. The Seoul Metropolitan Government dismissed the request because the Ilsan Line was located in Gyeonggi Province, and was concerned the increased expenditure should Seoul Metropolitan Subway operate the line. Ultimately, the Ilsan Line remained under the jurisdiction of the Korean National Railroad which became what is today Korail. On December 27, 2014 Wonheung station started operation.

Stations

References

See also
Subways in South Korea
Seoul Subway Line 3

Seoul Metropolitan Subway lines
Railway lines in South Korea
Railway lines opened in 1996
Transport in Goyang